The 1995 Oceania Youth Athletics Championships were held at the Tereora National Stadium in Tereora, Rarotonga, Cook Islands, between May 4–5, 1995.
A total of 31 events were contested, 16 by boys and 15 by girls.

Medal summary
Complete results can be found on the Athletics Weekly, and on the World Junior Athletics History webpages.

Boys under 18 (Youth)

Girls under 18 (Youth)

Medal table (unofficial)

Participation (unofficial)
An unofficial count yields the number of about 135 athletes from 14 countries:

 (3)
 (18)
 (22)
 (21)
 (8)
 (12)
 (5)
 (3)
 (6)
 (9)
 (7)
/ (10)
 (6)
 (5)

References

Oceania Youth Athletics Championships
Athletics in the Cook Islands
Oceanian U18 Championships
1995 in Cook Islands sport
International sports competitions hosted by the Cook Islands
1995 in youth sport
1995 in Oceanian sport
May 1995 sports events in Oceania